A Cultural Heritage Monument is a designation given by the government of Georgia to an immovable or movable object of material culture with a particular historical or cultural significance, on account of its antiquity, uniqueness, or authenticity.

The Georgian law defines an immovable monument as an object which is attached to and remain on the ground. The monuments which have an outstanding artistic or aesthetic value, are associated with a particularly important historical event, person, or overall national values, are categorized as Immovable Cultural Monuments of National Significance. A monument from this category can be submitted by the Prime Minister of Georgia for the inclusion in the World Heritage Site list.

References